Remaisnil is a commune in the Somme department in Hauts-de-France in northern France.  The village contains the Château de Remaisnil, which was owned by Jules Elby and Laura Ashley. In the field across from the mansion, remnants of a German V-1 Flying Bomb launch site are visible as well.

Geography

Population

See also
Communes of the Somme department

References

Communes of Somme (department)